Lucas Neff  (born November 7, 1985) is an American actor best known for his lead role in the Fox sitcom Raising Hope (2010-2014). Most recently, he starred in the CBS sitcom Carol's Second Act (2019) and co-starred as Duncan on Monsters at Work (2021) for Disney+.

Personal life
Neff was born and raised in the Andersonville area of Chicago, Illinois. His mother, Meade Palidofsky, is the founder of Storycatchers Theatre and his father, Alan, is a lawyer and novelist. He is of Irish and Jewish descent. He graduated from Whitney M. Young Magnet High School in 2004 and with a Bachelor of Fine Arts in Theater at the University of Illinois at Chicago in 2008. He started acting when he was mistakenly assigned to the performing arts department at UIC. After college, he took classes at the Steppenwolf Theatre Company in Chicago. Neff has a younger brother. He lives in Los Angeles, California. He and Australian actress Caitlin Stasey were married in 2016, and divorced in late 2020.

Career
His local theater debut was in the Chicago-based theater company Collaboraction's production of Jon. While trying to start his career by appearing in storefront theater and commercials, Neff financed himself by cleaning houses, which he only began a week before being cast in his first major role. His first television role came when he was cast in a minor role in the series finale of A&E Network's The Beast.

When a nationwide casting call was put out for Raising Hope, Neff taped his ten-page audition and sent it in to Greg Garcia. From the first tape, Neff became Garcia's first choice for the role of Jimmy Chance. However, he was still required to go through multiple auditions, before he could be confirmed in his first major role. Neff said of the series at the time of the pilot, "It's a very sweet-hearted, kind show, and it places family first and doing the right thing first. You don't see a lot of that in TV or movies. We celebrate a lot of fancy heroes and fancy criminals and infidelity and, generally, just a lot of bad behavior. It's nice to be part of a show that celebrates decency and being good to one another."

Neff maintained his links with the theater, writing plays, such as The Last Duck, which was performed at the Jackalope Theatre in Chicago as the final play of the 2011–2012 season. It was nominated for a Joseph Jefferson Award for Best New Work.

Filmography

Film

Television

References

External links
 

1985 births
Living people
Male actors from Chicago
American male film actors
American people of Irish descent
American people of Jewish descent
American male television actors
American male stage actors
American male voice actors
University of Illinois Chicago alumni